Thomas Taylor (1738/9–1808) was the Archdeacon of Chichester from his installation on 15 October 1803 until his death on 4 January 1808. He was an alumnus of St. John's College at the University of Oxford, where he matriculated on 8 February 1757, at the age of 18. He became Rector of Wotton in Surrey in 1778 and Rector of Abinger in the same county in 1803, until his death. He was Professor of Law at Gresham College and an Honorary Chaplain to the King.

Notes

Alumni of Magdalen College, Oxford
Archdeacons of Chichester
Honorary Chaplains to the King
Professors of Gresham College
1808 deaths
Year of birth unknown